A linear compressor is a gas compressor where the piston moves along a linear track to minimize friction and reduce energy loss during conversion of motion. This technology has been successfully used in cryogenic applications which must be oilless. Suspension spring can be flexure type or coil type. Oil-free valved linear compressor allows the use of compact heat exchangers. Linear compressors work similarly to a solenoid: by using a spring-loaded piston with an electromagnet connected to AC through a diode. The spring-loaded piston is the only moving part, and it is placed in the center of the electromagnet. During the positive cycle of the AC, the diode allows energy to pass through the electromagnet, generating a magnetic field that moves the piston backwards, compressing the spring, and generating suction. During the negative cycle of the AC, the diode blocks current flow to the electromagnet, letting the spring uncompress, moving the piston forward, and compressing the refrigerant. The compressed refrigerant is then released by a valve.

History
A number of patents for linear compressors powered by free-piston engines were issued in the 20th century, including:
 To Brown, Boveri & Cie, GB191215963, published 1913-10-08
 To Hugo Junkers, CA245708, published 1924-12-30
 To Raúl Pateras Pescara, US1615133, published 1927-01-18 

The first market introduction of a linear compressor to compress refrigerant in a refrigerator was in 2001.

Valved linear compressor
The single piston linear compressor uses dynamic counterbalancing, where an auxiliary movable mass is flexibly attached to a movable piston assembly and to the stationary compressor casing using auxiliary mechanical springs with zero vibration export at minimum electrical power and current consumed by the motor. It is used in cryogenics.

Linear compressors are used in LG and Kenmore refrigerators.  Compressors of this type have less noise, and are more energy efficient than conventional refrigerator compressors.

See also

Scroll compressor

References

External links 
 

Gas compressors
Vacuum pumps
Cooling technology
Hydrogen technologies